Fishtail Lake is a lake located on Vancouver Island east of  Mount Arrowsmith.

References

Alberni Valley
Lakes of Vancouver Island
Cameron Land District